Malik Antonio Willis (born May 25, 1999) is an American football quarterback for the Tennessee Titans of the National Football League (NFL). He played college football at Auburn before transferring to Liberty, where he won the 2020 Dudley Award. Willis was drafted by the Titans in the third round of the 2022 NFL Draft.

Early years
Willis attended Westlake High School in Atlanta before transferring to Roswell High School in Roswell, Georgia, for his senior year. As a senior, he passed for 2,562 yards and rushed for 1,033 yards with 37 total touchdowns. He committed to Auburn University to play college football.

College career

Auburn
Willis spent 2017 and 2018 at Auburn and played in 15 games. During the two years, he completed 11 of 14 passes for 69 yards with a touchdown and rushed for 309 yards and two touchdowns.

Liberty
Willis transferred to Liberty University in 2019 following a quarterback competition with Bo Nix and sat out the season due to transfer rules. In 2020, he was named the team's starting quarterback. Against Southern Mississippi, he threw for six touchdowns and rushed for another.

Willis was named the winner of the 2020 Dudley Award, given to the best college football player in the state of Virginia, and was the recipient of the 2021 Bobby Bowden Award, awarded to the best college football player who epitomizes being a Christian student-athlete. He was named MVP of the 2020 Cure Bowl and the 2021 LendingTree Bowl.

Statistics

Professional career

Willis was drafted in the third round (86th overall) of the 2022 NFL Draft by the Tennessee Titans. He was considered a surprise fall in the draft as he was projected by some to be selected as high as second overall. He signed his four-year rookie contract on July 23, 2022.

2022 season

Willis made his NFL debut in Week 2 against the Buffalo Bills in the third quarter after the Titans benched Ryan Tannehill. He completed one of his four passing attempts while throwing for six yards and rushed for 16 yards in the 41–7 loss.

Willis was named as a starter in Week 8 against the Texans, relieving Ryan Tannehill due to illness. In his first start, Willis completed 6 of 10 pass attempts for 55 yards and one interception in a 17–10 victory.

Willis started in place of an injured Tannehill for a second consecutive week in Week 9 against the Chiefs. He completed 5 of his 16 passing attempts for 80 yards in the 20–17 overtime loss.

NFL career statistics

Personal life
Willis’ uncle is 10-year NFL linebacker James Anderson.

References

External links

 
 
 Tennessee Titans bio
 Liberty Flames bio
 Auburn Tigers bio

1999 births
Living people
African-American Christians
African-American players of American football
American football quarterbacks
Auburn Tigers football players
Liberty Flames football players
Players of American football from Atlanta
Tennessee Titans players